Macomb Township may refer to the following places in the United States:

 Macomb Township, McDonough County, Illinois
 Macomb City Township, McDonough County, Illinois (contiguous with Macomb, Illinois)
 Macomb Township, Michigan

Township name disambiguation pages